<noinclude>

The battle of Rubizhne was a military engagement that started on 15 March 2022 and ended on 12 May 2022 during the 2022 Russian invasion of Ukraine, as part of the eastern Ukraine offensive and the battle of Donbas.

Background 
At around 15:00 on 28 February, Russian forces began to shell Sievierodonetsk, the acting administrative center of Luhansk Oblast, located just southeast of Rubizhne. According to Serhiy Haidai, the governor of Luhansk Oblast, one person was killed and several were injured. Gas pipelines were also hit by the shelling.

On 2 March, fighting was reported in almost all the villages near Sievierodonetsk. Russian forces continued to shell the city, including a school gym that was acting as a bomb shelter. No deaths were reported. At 15:20 that day, Ukrainian officials said Russian forces tried to enter the city, but were repelled. Four days later, Haidai stated that fighting was taking place on the outskirts of Lysychansk, Sievierodonetsk and Rubizhne.

Battle

March 
On 17 March, pro-Russian LPR forces advanced into and captured the western and northwestern outskirts of Rubizhne and then attacked the southern part of the town around noon, while capturing a city administration building. By the following day, the LPR was in control of portions of Rubizhne, while fighting continued in the southern part of the town. Between 19 and 20 March, Russian and LPR forces captured the village of Varvarivka, north of Rubizhne. 

On 22 March, the head of the LPR, Leonid Pasechnik, claimed that "almost 80% of the territory" of the Luhansk region was taken and "Popasna, Lysychansk, Rubizhne, Sievierodonetsk and Kreminna have not been liberated". He noted that the situation in the battlefields is "stably tense" and units of the People's Militia of the LPR were striving to take Popasna and Rubizhne under control. Two days later, Russian forces made advances in Rubizhne.

April 
By 6 April, Russian forces had reportedly captured 60% of the city of Rubizhne, shells and rockets were landing in the city on "regular, sustained intervals". The next day, forces of the 128th Mountain Assault Brigade conducted an offensive which reportedly drove Russian forces 6–10 kilometers away from the town of Kreminna, located northwest of Rubizhne.

On 9 April, elements of the Russian 4th Guards Tank Division were reportedly concentrating in the area. Between 11 and 12 April, continuing Russian attacks gained no ground. By 16 April, Ukraine claimed that 70% of Sievierodonetsk was destroyed by Russian shelling.

On 18 April, Russia renewed its offensive in Donbas, launching airstrikes into Sievierodonetsk. That morning, Russian troops entered Kreminna, as Ukrainian forces lost control amid heavy fighting. Haidai claimed that more than 200 civilians were killed during the battle, with four additional civilians being killed and one more wounded as they attempted to escape the fighting. During the fighting, a LPR battalion commander was killed when he and his fighters were surrounded by Ukrainian forces close to Kreminna and "fought to the last", according to the LPR. The clashes left an unknown number of killed and wounded. By the next day, Russian forces secured full control of Kreminna.

On 20 April, Russian and LPR forces advanced in Rubizhne, capturing the central part of the city. As of 26 April, the Russian military was slowly advancing west and south of the city in an attempt to encircle Ukrainian forces.

May 
Ukraine reported on 3 May, that Russian aircraft bombed a grain elevator in Rubizhne. The grain elevator, owned by Golden AGRO LLC and opened in 2020 was completely destroyed. Also, on 3 May, the village of Mykhailivka near Rubizhne was shelled, St. Elijah's Monastery Barbarian and rector of the church of St. Theodosius of Chernihiv in Mykhailivka, hieromonk Parthenius died. On 4 May, Ukrainian forces claimed that Russian forces tried to take full control of Rubizhne without success. It was reported that Russian forces seized Rubizhne and the nearby town of Voevodivka on 12 May 2022. The BBC claims that during the fighting for Rubizhne up to 1500 shells per day were fired before Russian forces advanced.

Casualties 
At least 13 civilians were killed and 14 wounded due to fighting in the city.

References 

Rubizhne
History of Luhansk Oblast
Battles involving Russia
Rubizhne
March 2022 events in Ukraine
April 2022 events in Ukraine
May 2022 events in Ukraine
Eastern Ukraine offensive
Battles involving the Luhansk People's Republic